Mehrab Hossain (born 8 July 1987) is a Bangladeshi cricketer who came through successfully through the age groups of the country. He was a member of the U-19 Bangladesh National Cricket Team of the 2006 U-19 Cricket World Cup and was called in the national team for the first time at the 2006 ICC Champions Trophy. He is a left-handed middle order batsman and slow left arm bowler. He represented Bangladesh in 12 U19 ODI matches, taking 16 wickets and scoring 213 runs. In May 2007 he was picked for the Bangladesh Test squad for the first time, for India's tour of the country.

References

External links
 
 

Living people
Bangladeshi cricketers
Bangladesh Test cricketers
Bangladesh One Day International cricketers
Bangladesh Twenty20 International cricketers
Dhaka Division cricketers
Dhaka Dominators cricketers
Dhaka Metropolis cricketers
Chattogram Challengers cricketers
1987 births
People from Rajshahi District
Kala Bagan Krira Chakra cricketers
Partex Sporting Club cricketers
Prime Bank Cricket Club cricketers
Bangladesh Central Zone cricketers